Faceless may refer to:

Films
Faceless (1988 film), French slasher film
Faceless (2007 film), Austrian/British science fiction film 
 Faceless (2016 film), Canadian-Afghan action film

Music
Faceless (Godsmack album), 2003 album
The Faceless, American death metal group
Faceless (Buried in Verona album), 2014 album
"Faceless" (EP), 1991 EP by Impetigo, or the title song
"Faceless" (song), 2010 song by Red

Literature
Faceless, 2001 novel by Martina Cole
Faceless, 2003 novel by Amma Darko

Other
"Faceless", a creature in comic books or video games
Faceless men, term from Australian politics